Independence Day in North Macedonia is celebrated on 8 September. It has been a national holiday since 1991, when, following a referendum for Independence, SR Macedonia gained its independence from Yugoslavia, where it was a federal state, and became a sovereign parliamentary democracy.

History
On 8 September 1991, over 95.5% of the 75.8% turnout voters on the Referendum voted for the independence of the Republic Macedonia. "Dear citizens of Macedonia, allow me tonight to you and to all citizens of Macedonia to congratulate the free, sovereign and independent Macedonia!" - said the President of the then Republic of Macedonia Kiro Gligorov on the evening of 8 September, addressing the citizens who spontaneously gathered at Macedonia Square in the capital Skopje, to celebrate the successful referendum. 

The people's will for an independent state was confirmed with the Declaration of the referendum results on 18 September 1991, by the first multi-party Macedonian Parliament. Finally, on 25 September 1991, the Declaration of Independence was adopted by the Macedonian Parliament. Next, the new Constitution of the Republic of Macedonia was adopted on 17 November 1991. 

Due to Greek opposition to a new state containing the term 'Macedonia', the sovereign status of the state was not recognized until 8 April 1993, with an acclamation of the UN General Assembly, when  Republic of Macedonia was admitted as 181st full-fledged member in the world organisation under the provisional reference the Former Yugoslav Republic of Macedonia.

Celebration
Independence Day as a national holiday is a non-working day in North Macedonia. The President and the Government of North Macedonia are organizing various festivities. The President traditionally awards the Order 8-September. People traditionally go to picnics in famous picnic places. The Macedonian Olympic Committee organizes sports picnics, while the Motorcycle Federation of North Macedonia organizes the International Motorcycle Rally "Macedonia 2008" in Skopje.

All Macedonian embassies, consulates and representative offices organize cocktails and festivities in the countries where they are located.

References

September observances
Public holidays in North Macedonia
Macedonia
Observances in North Macedonia